Dharwadi is a village in Pathardi taluka in Ahmednagar District of Maharashtra State, India. It belongs to Khandesh and Northern Maharashtra region . It belongs to Nashik Division . It is located 28 km towards East from District headquarters Ahmednagar. 29 km from Pathardi. 257 km from State capital Mumbai.

Population

Local schools in Dharwadi
 Shri Tilok Jain Jr College Pathardi
 Babuji Avhad Mahavidyalaya
 Shri Navnath junior high school and college

Nearest colleges to Dharwadi
 Pathardi: Shri Tilok Jain Jr College Pathardi and Babuji Avhad Mahavidyalaya
 Karanji: Shri Navnath junior high school and college

Temples in Dharwadi
 Shri VamanBhau Mandir
 Shri Maruti Mandir
 Shri Lakshmi Mandir
 Shri Tulajabhawani Mandir
 Shri MohataDevi Mandir
 Shri GosaiBaba Mandir

Nearest villages to Dharwadi
 Khandgaon (5 km)
 Damalwadi (5 km)
 Kolhar (5 km)
 Kadgaon (6 km)
 Mohoj Khurd (6 km)
 Lohsar (2.5 km)
 Chichondi-Shiral (2.5 km)

Images of Dharwadi

Villages in Ahmednagar district
Ahmednagar
Ahmednagar district
Villages in Pathardi taluka